Wen Da (born 25 October 1999) is a Chinese footballer currently playing as a forward for Wuhan FC.

Club career
Wen Da was promoted to the senior team of Beijing Guoan within the 2020 Chinese Super League season and would make his debut in league game on 28 September 2020 against Shijiazhuang Ever Bright in a 4-0 victory where he came on as a substitute for Li Ke.

Career statistics

References

External links

1999 births
Living people
Chinese footballers
Association football forwards
Chinese Super League players
Beijing Guoan F.C. players